Maurice Victor Macmillan, Viscount Macmillan of Ovenden (27 January 1921 – 10 March 1984), was a British Conservative Party politician and Member of Parliament. He was the only son of Harold Macmillan, 1st Earl of Stockton, who was Prime Minister of the United Kingdom from 1957 to 1963.

Background and education
Macmillan was the only son of Harold Macmillan, 1st Earl of Stockton, and Lady Dorothy Cavendish, daughter of Victor Cavendish, 9th Duke of Devonshire. He was educated at Eton and Balliol College, Oxford. He served with the Sussex Yeomanry in Europe in the Second World War. Like his father, he was chairman of Macmillan Publishers, as well as a director of two news agencies.

Political career
Macmillan contested Seaham at the 1945 election, Lincoln in 1951 and Wakefield at a 1954 by-election. He served on Kensington Borough Council from 1949 to 1953, then was elected MP for Halifax at the 1955 general election but lost this seat in 1964. He was then elected for Farnham in 1966. This latter seat became South West Surrey at the 1983 election. He served as Economic Secretary to the Treasury (1963–64) under Alec Douglas-Home, and as Chief Secretary to the Treasury (1970–72), Secretary of State for Employment (1972–73) and Paymaster General (1973–74) under Edward Heath. He was made a Privy Counsellor in 1972.

Family
Macmillan married the Honourable Katharine Ormsby-Gore, daughter of William Ormsby-Gore, 4th Baron Harlech, on 22 August 1942. They had four sons and a daughter:

Alexander Daniel Alan Macmillan, 2nd Earl of Stockton (born 10 October 1943)
Hon. Joshua Edward Andrew Macmillan (1945–1965)
Hon. Adam Julian Robert Macmillan (1948–2016)
Hon. Rachel Mary Georgia Macmillan (1955–1987)
Hon. David Maurice Benjamin Macmillan (born 1957); married English fashion designer Arabella Pollen in 1995 and has issue.

Macmillan was for a time the owner of Highgrove House, which he sold to the Prince of Wales in 1980. Upon his father's elevation to the peerage as Earl of Stockton on 10 February 1984, Macmillan acquired the courtesy title Viscount Macmillan of Ovenden. He held the title for just  days, dying in Westminster, London, on 10 March 1984, following a heart operation. He was 63. His father outlived him by almost three years, dying in December 1986 at the age of 92.

Macmillan's son Alexander has held the title 2nd Earl of Stockton since the death of the first Earl.

Arms

References

External links
 

1921 births
1984 deaths
British Army personnel of World War II
Sussex Yeomanry officers
Conservative Party (UK) MPs for English constituencies
British Secretaries of State
Children of prime ministers of the United Kingdom
Members of Kensington Metropolitan Borough Council
British courtesy viscounts
Heirs apparent who never acceded
Members of the Privy Council of the United Kingdom
People educated at Eton College
Alumni of Balliol College, Oxford
UK MPs 1955–1959
UK MPs 1959–1964
UK MPs 1966–1970
UK MPs 1970–1974
UK MPs 1974
UK MPs 1974–1979
UK MPs 1979–1983
UK MPs 1983–1987
Ministers in the Macmillan and Douglas-Home governments, 1957–1964
Chief Secretaries to the Treasury